Shelby Cannon and Scott Melville were the defending champions, but they lost in the second round to Ronald Agénor and Younes El Aynaoui.

Yevgeny Kafelnikov and David Rikl won the title by defeating Jim Courier and Javier Sánchez 5–7, 6–1, 6–4 in the final.

Seeds
The first four seeds received a bye into the second round.

Draw

Finals

Top half

Bottom half

References

External links
 Official results archive (ATP)
 Official results archive (ITF)

1994 ATP Tour